Alex Gough may refer to:
Alex Gough (luger) (born 1987), female Canadian Olympic luger
Alex Gough (squash player) (born 1970), male professional squash player
Alexander Gough (1614–?), English actor
 Alexander Dick Gough (1804–1871), English architect